Margaret Manton Merrill (1859 – June 19/20, 1893) was a British-born American journalist, writer, translator, and elocutionist. At the age of twenty, she became the founder, owner and editor of the Colorado Temperance Gazette. She stayed in journalism for twelve years, where her noted successes were in the line of stories for children, while she likewise made translations from such diverse languages as Scandinavian and Sioux.

Early life and education
Margaret Manton Merrill was born in England in 1859. Her father was the Rt. Rev. William E. Merrill, who for forty years was one of the foremost educators of the Northwest. Her mother was a grandniece of Sir Arthur Wellesley, 1st Duke of Wellington, and her grandmother on the maternal side was second-cousin to "Royal Charlie" of Scotland. In spite of her lineage, Merrill was very proud of the fact that she was an American.

Entering Carleton College at the age of fourteen, she remained there a year, and then continued her studies in the University of Minnesota, from which institution she was graduated, being chosen by her class as the valedictorian.

Career
The succeeding fall, at the age of eighteen, she began her career as teacher, which vocation she continued for two years. Her taste for literary work led her to the journalistic field, when she was twenty years old.

Going to Denver, she purchased the Colorado Temperance Gazette, which was then the only temperance paper in that State. The venture was not a success, on account of the doings of a partner, and also because the anti-temperance spirit was at that time too strong in Colorado for the prosperity of a paper wholly devoted to that cause. Later, during the temperance campaigns in Kansas and Iowa, she became a lecturer and organizer. She was especially able in her labors among children.

In 1887, she went to New York City to do regular newspaper work. When the Woman's Press Club of New York City was organized, she was one of the charter members, and was elected the club's first secretary. She was a journalist of Sorosis, and a very active member of that organization. She then went upon the staff of the New York Herald and was the only woman employed in that capacity by that journal. In addition, she did syndicate and miscellaneous work, being especially successful as a writer of children's stories.

During her vacations, she was an extensive traveler. At the time of the famine in South Dakota, in 1889, she went through nineteen destitute counties in midwinter, visiting the homes of the people, and bringing back to her paper correct accounts of the condition of affairs there. The result was that large contributions were sent from the East. During 1890, she visited Yellowstone Park and wrote accounts for papers in the West and in England, which attracted attention. While in California, she wrote a poem, entitled "The Faro Dealer's Story," which gained for her considerable local fame. Still later, she contemplated a work upon ancient Babylon.

After removing to the United States, she spent thirty-five years in Minnesota, Colorado, and California. She died June 19/20, 1893 in Manhattan, New York, and was buried at Woodlawn Cemetery, The Bronx, New York.

References

Attribution

External links
 
 

1859 births
1893 deaths
19th-century American journalists
19th-century American women writers
19th-century British journalists
19th-century British women writers
19th-century British translators
English journalists
English translators
American people of British descent
University of Minnesota alumni
American women non-fiction writers
Elocutionists
Wikipedia articles incorporating text from A Woman of the Century